In baseball, wOBA (/'woʊbə/, or weighted on-base average) is a statistic, based on linear weights, designed to measure a player's overall offensive contributions per plate appearance. It is formed from taking the observed run values of various offensive events, dividing by a player's plate appearances, and scaling the result to be on the same scale as on-base percentage. Unlike statistics like OPS, wOBA attempts to assign the proper value for each type of hitting event. It was created by Tom Tango and his coauthors for The Book: Playing the Percentages in Baseball.

Usage 

In 2008, sabermetrics website FanGraphs began listing the current and historical wOBA for all players in Major League Baseball. It forms the basis of the offensive component of their wins above replacement (WAR) metric. Sites such as The Hardball Times have studied wOBA and found it to perform comparably to or better than other similar tools (OPS, RC, etc.) used in sabermetrics to estimate runs. The Book uses wOBA in numerous studies to test the validity of many aspects of baseball conventional wisdom.

The benefit of wOBA compared to other offensive value statistics is that it values not just whether the runner reached base but how. Events like home runs, walks, singles, etc. are given their own weight (or coefficient) within the linear formula. The weighting is based on the increase in expected runs for the event type as compared to an out. The coefficients change each season based upon how often each event occurs.

Because the coefficients are derived from expected run value, we can use wOBA to estimate a few more things about a player's production and baseball as a whole. When using the formula (shown below), the numerator side on its own will give us an estimate of how many runs a player is worth to his team. Similarly, a team's wOBA is a good estimator of team runs scored, and deviations from predicted runs scored indicate a combination of situational hitting and base running.

2019 Formula 

Per Fangraphs, the formula for wOBA in the 2019 season was:

where:
 NIBB = Non-intentional bases on balls
 HBP = Hit by pitch
 1B = Single
 2B = Double
 3B = Triple
 HR = Home run

—————

 AB = at bat
 BB = Base on balls
 IBB = Intentional base on balls
 SF = sacrifice flies
 HBP = Hit by pitch

2018 Formula 

The formula for the 2018 season was:

 NIBB = Non-intentional bases on balls
 HBP = Hit by pitch
 1B = Single
 2B = Double
 3B = Triple
 HR = Home run

—————

 AB = at bat
 BB = Base on balls
 IBB = Intentional base on balls
 SF = sacrifice flies
 HBP = Hit by pitch

Ranges for elite, very good, etc. 

The following table serves as an aggregate summary of various wOBA scales available online.

Original Formula 

The formula below appeared in The Book.

where:
 NIBB = Non-intentional bases on balls
 HBP = Hit by pitch
 1B = Single
 RBOE = Reached base on error
 2B = Double
 3B = Triple
 HR = Home run
 PA = Plate appearance

Citations

References 

 Tom Tango, Mitchel Lichtman, and Andrew Dolphin. The Book: Playing the Percentages in Baseball. Washington, D.C.: Potomac Books, 2007. .

Batting statistics